Ellipsoptera hamata, the coastal tiger beetle, is a species of flashy tiger beetle in the family Carabidae. It is found in Central America and North America.

Subspecies
These four subspecies belong to the species Ellipsoptera hamata:
 Ellipsoptera hamata hamata (Audouin & Brullé, 1839)
 Ellipsoptera hamata lacerata (Chaudoir, 1854)
 Ellipsoptera hamata monti (Vaurie, 1951)
 Ellipsoptera hamata pallifera (Chaudoir, 1852)

References

Further reading

 

Cicindelidae
Articles created by Qbugbot
Beetles described in 1839